The 2004 Idaho Vandals football team represented the University of Idaho during the 2004 NCAA Division I-A football season. Idaho competed as a member of the Sun Belt Conference, and played their home games in the Kibbie Dome, an indoor facility on campus in Moscow, Idaho. Led by first-year head coach Nick Holt, the Vandals finished at 3–9 (2–5 in Sun Belt, last).

Holt was previously the linebackers coach at USC and an Idaho assistant coach for eight seasons in the 1990s.

Schedule

Fallen teammate
The season was marred by the September death of starting cornerback Eric McMillan, a redshirt freshman from Murrieta, California, and originally from Tuskegee, Alabama.  In a case of mistaken identity, he was shot in his apartment in south Moscow on Sunday afternoon, a day after the third game of season, and died at Gritman Medical Center.

References

External links
Idaho Argonaut – student newspaper – 2004 editions

Idaho
Idaho Vandals football seasons
Idaho Vandals football